Bayerisch Gmain is a municipality in the district of Berchtesgadener Land in Bavaria in Germany.

Notable residents 

 Hans Erlwein (1872–1914), architect, town councilor in Bamberg and Dresden
 Claire Waldoff (1884–1957), cabaret artist, singer, lived from 1939 until her death in Bayerisch Gmain
 Ines Papert (born 1974), German sport climber and ice climbing champion
 Johannes Frießner (1892-1971) German Commander of XXIII Army Corps during World War Two

References

Berchtesgadener Land